The United States Air Force's 263rd Combat Communications Squadron (263rd CCS) is an Air National Guard combat communications unit located at the Stanly County Airport Air National Guard Station in Albemarle, North Carolina.

History
The squadron was allocated in 1946 but was not formed until January 1949, as part of the 118th Aircraft Control and Warning Squadron in Charlotte, North Carolina.  Detachment B (the Badin unit) and Detachment A (of the Wadesboro, North Carolina unit) were reorganized in 1952 into the "263rd Communications Squadron". The squadron became a unit of the 251st Communications Group headquartered in Springfield, Ohio in 1954 and re-designated the 263rd Mobile Communications Squadron in 1962. During the 1970s the squadron was again re-designated to the current "263rd Combat Communications Squadron".

Mission
The mission of the 263rd Combat Communications Squadron is to provide theater communications for the Commander of the United States Central Command.

Assignments
In December 2018 members of the 263rd CCS, a detachment of the North Carolina Air National Guard's 145th Airlift Wing, were deployed to Williams Field at McMurdo Station, Antarctica participating as part of Operation Deep Freeze.

Major Command/Gaining Command
Air National Guard/Air Combat Command (???- ???)
Air National Guard/Tactical Air Command (???- ???)

Bases stationed
Badin ANGS, North Carolina (???-Present)

References

Combat Communications 0281
Combat Communications 263
Military units and formations in North Carolina